Operation Heavenly is the fourth and final studio album by English indie pop band Heavenly. It was released by Wiiija in October 1996. In the United States it was issued by K Records, whose founder Calvin Johnson provided guest vocals on "Pet Monkey". The album contains ten original songs and a cover of Serge Gainsbourg's "Nous Ne Somme Pas Des Anges".

K released "Trophy Girlfriend" on a split 7-inch single with two songs by Bis. The single bore the overall title International Pop Underground Vol. 66.

"Space Manatee" was also released as a single, backed by two exclusive B-sides: covers of "You Tore Me Down" (originally by The Flamin' Groovies) and "Art School" (by The Jam). The two cover versions were included on a Japanese reissue of the album in 1998.

Music videos were made for both singles.

After Mathew Fletcher died by suicide in June 1996, the remaining members retired the name Heavenly. They later regrouped as Marine Research for one album in 1999.

Track listing

"Trophy Girlfriend"
"K-Klass Kisschase"
"Space Manatee"
"Ben Sherman"
"By the Way"
"Cut Off"
"Nous Ne Sommes Pas Des Anges"
"Mark Angel"
"Fat Lenny"
"Snail Trail"
"Pet Monkey"

References

Heavenly (British band) albums
1996 albums